The House of Shame is a 1928 American silent drama film directed by Burton L. King and starring Creighton Hale, Virginia Brown Faire and Lloyd Whitlock.

Cast
 Creighton Hale as Harvey Baremore  
 Virginia Brown Faire as Druid Baremore  
 Lloyd Whitlock as John Kimball  
 Florence Dudley as Doris  
 Fred Walton as M. Fanchon  
 Carlton S. King as The Irate Husband 
 Julia Griffith as Country Club Gossip  
 George Kuwa as Kuwa - Kimball's Valet

References

Bibliography
 Michael R. Pitts. Poverty Row Studios, 1929-1940: An Illustrated History of 55 Independent Film Companies, with a Filmography for Each. McFarland & Company, 2005.

External links

1928 films
1928 drama films
Silent American drama films
Films directed by Burton L. King
American silent feature films
1920s English-language films
Chesterfield Pictures films
American black-and-white films
1920s American films